This page provides supplementary chemical data on sodium sulfate.

Material Safety Data Sheet  

The handling of this chemical may incur notable safety precautions. It is highly recommend that you seek the Safety Data Sheet (SDS) for this chemical from the manufacturer and follow its directions.

Structure and properties

Thermodynamic properties

Spectral data

References

Chemical data pages
Chemical data pages cleanup